Dr. Alexander Bachmanov studied veterinary medicine at the Saint Petersburg Veterinary Institute, Russia (1977-1982), received his Ph.D. in biological sciences from the Pavlov Institute of Physiology in Saint Petersburg, Russia in 1990. He completed postdoctoral fellowships at the Physiological Laboratory at Cambridge University in 1993 and at the Monell Chemical Senses Center, Philadelphia, Pennsylvania, in the United States from 1994 to 1997. He later joined Monnell's faculty.

Career and research 
His research at the Monell Chemical Senses Center focused on the genetics of taste, ingestive behavior, alcohol intake, metabolism and obesity.  Bachmanov and his collaborators pioneered using the positional cloning approach to identify genes influencing behavior.  Their identification of the mouse saccharin preference (Sac) genetic locus as a gene encoding the TAS1R3 taste receptor was the first successful positional cloning of a behavioral quantitative trait locus (QTL). They have mapped several mouse QTLs for alcohol consumption and obesity. To discover novel genes involved in taste, they used transcriptomic and genetic engineering approaches.

In 2017,  Bachmanov joined GSK, located in Collegeville, Pennsylvania, to work on pre-clinical drug discovery and development.

Select publications
 Bachmanov AA, Kiefer SW, Molina JC, Tordoff MG, Duffy VB, Bartoshuk LM, Mennella JA (2003) Chemosensory factors influencing alcohol perception, preferences and consumption.  Alcoholism: Clinical and Experimental Research 27 (2): 220-231.
 Bachmanov AA, Beauchamp GK (2007). Taste Receptor Genes.  Annual Review of Nutrition 27:389-414.
 Boughter JD, Bachmanov AA (2008) Genetics and Evolution of Taste. In: Basbaum AI, Kaneko A, Shepherd GM, Westheimer G (eds), The Senses: A Comprehensive Reference, Vol. 4 (Firestein S, Beauchamp GK eds), Olfaction and Taste. Elsevier/Academic Press, San Diego, CA.  P. 371-390.

References

External links
Monell's web site

Year of birth missing (living people)
Living people
Russian geneticists